Commandos is the second studio album by Norwegian hard rock band Stage Dolls, released in 1986 through Grappa Music (Norway) and in 1987 through Big Time Records (Europe, North America).

Track listing

Personnel
Torstein Flakne – vocals, guitar
Brynjulf Blix – keyboard
Steinar Krokstad – drums
Terje Storli – bass
Bjørn Nessjø – production
Rune Nordahl – engineering

References

1986 albums
Stage Dolls albums